The Jewish Boat to Gaza was an initiative in an attempt to break the blockade of Gaza in late 2010. The boat, a catamaran named the MV Irene, had eight activists on board, all of them either Israelis or Jews from the United States, United Kingdom, or Germany, plus one English photojournalist, a total of nine passengers. It received support by the Israeli Committee Against House Demolitions (ICAHD). The boat set sail from Northern Cyprus on November 26, 2010.

The boat was stopped by the Israeli Navy on November 28, 2010, after being warned to change course. The Irene was confronted by at least 10 Israeli warships and boarded from speedboats by Shayetet 13 naval commandos. The vessel and activists were taken to Ashdod port, where foreign activists were handed over to members of the Interior Ministry's Oz Unit, while the Israelis were taken to the Ashdod police station for questioning. A group of 20 Israelis staged a protest near Ashdod port. Activists and family members followed the Israeli passengers as they were taken in for police interrogation and protested.

References

External links 
 http://jewishboattogaza.org/ [Defunct]

2010 in the Gaza Strip
Maritime incidents in Israel
Maritime incidents in 2010
2010 in Israel